Latur railway station (Station Code: LUR)  is a  railway station in Central Railway zone which serves the city of Latur, Maharashtra. It is the start of the Latur–Miraj section of the Solapur (SUR) Division of Central Railway (CR).

Marathwada Railway Coach Factory, Latur 
Indian Railways decided to set up a metro and rail coach manufacturing facility in Latur in Maharashtra. The project is likely it entail investment of more than Rs 1,500 crore.
Maharashtra chief minister Devendra Fadnavis and railway minister Piyush Goyal approved setting up a rail coach factory in Latur, The facility will cater to the demands of metro coaches in cities across India along with the captive demand from coming from Indian Railways.

Not with standing Covid-19 related challenges, Indian Railways' PSU, Rail Vikas Nigam Limited (RVNL) commissioned Marathwada Rail Coach Factory in Maharashtra's Latur on the Good Governance Day with the production of the first coach shell on December 25, 2020. The factory was commissioned in only about two years ago.

According to the Ministry of Railways' release, the factory is going to contribute to the overall development of this region of the state by heralding a modern industrial ecosystem. It has been designed with an initial capacity of manufacturing 250 MEMU/EMU/LHB/train set type advanced coaches per annum.

However, its capacity can be enhanced as "sufficient vacant space" has been marked in the layout plan. The cost of this project amounting to over Rs 500 crores and the land cost of Rs 120 crores, as per the release.

The factory has been set up in 350 acres of land comprising 52,000 square meter pre-engineered building sheds, three-line yard, electric substation with 33kV supply, canteen, security and administrative blocks, and a residential colony in 24 acres.

A five km long rail connectivity has been provided for the movement of coaches from the factory to a new electronically inter-locked Harangul railway station, which earlier used to be only a halt station. It has also been equipped with the latest state-of-the-art machinery and plant, material handling systems and various utilities.

Various green initiatives have been adopted in the project for sustainable development which includes 800 kiloWatt shed roof-mounted solar power plant, sewage and wastewater treatment and recycling plant, rainwater harvesting, plantation of 10,000 trees, LED lighting, natural daylighting and ventilation in sheds. The administrative Block has also been built with green building concepts, the release stated.

Express trains 
 Latur–Mumbai SF Express
 Lokmanya Tilak Terminus–Hazur Sahib Nanded Express(Cancel)
 Hyderabad–Pune Express
 Panvel–Hazur Sahib Nanded Express
 Lokmanya Tilak Terminus–Bidar Express(Cancel)
 Nagpur–CSMT Kolhapur Express
 Yesvantpur–Latur Express
 Bidar–Kolhapur Express(Cancel)
 Deekshabhoomi Express
 Mumbai-Bidar SF Express

Administration 
The railway station comes under the Solapur railway division of Central Railway zone.

History 

In the past during Nizam's period, Latur railway was a narrow gauge but in 2003 work started to convert it to a broad gauge in Barsi Light Railway. By chief minister Vilasrao Deshmukh and railway minister Nitish Kumar. In 2004, the entire Miraj–Latur line was converted from narrow gauge to broad gauge.

Jaldoot Express 
For the first time in Maharashtra history, due to the drought the Latur city faced for three consecutive years, the summer of 2016 presented itself with extreme scarcity of water. To overcome this issue, a joint project was then requested by Railway Minister Suresh Prabhu and Maharashtra Chief Minister Devendra Fadnavis. After further research, and many changes in plan, Miraj was chosen to transport water to Latur from 342 km away. The "Jaldoot" train made its first experimental run on 11 April 2016, carrying 10 tanker wagons, each filled with 50,000 liters of water. Over 250,000 litres of water were transported, and the program was and continues to be a success.

Electrification
The Kurduwadi–Latur–Latur Road line will be electrified as per union railway budget 2014–15.

Line and location
The railway track in the Kurduwadi–Latur Road sector will be doubled at a cost of Rs. 700 crore.
Indian Railways also has plans for extending the railway line from Latur Road to Bodhan which in turn will pave way for Latur to have direct connectivity to Nizamabad, Warangal, Vishakapatnam, Adilabad many other cities of Telangana which are located in neighbouring state of Telangana.

Other stations in Latur 
The other stations that serve the city of Latur are

 
 Harangul railway station

References

External links 

Railway stations in Latur district
Solapur railway division
Railway stations opened in 2007